Padilla Bay is a bay located in the U.S. state of Washington, between the San Juan Islands and the mainland. Fidalgo Island and Guemes Island lie to the west of Padilla Bay. Guemes Channel, between the islands, connects Padilla Bay to Rosario Strait. Samish Island lies to the north of Padilla Bay, beyond which is Samish Bay and Bellingham Bay.

History
In 1791 the Spaniard José María Narváez explored and named Padilla Bay, calling it Seno Padillo, in honor of Juan Vicente de Güemes Padilla Horcasitas, the viceroy of New Spain.

The Estuary
Padilla Bay is a tidal bay. It is entirely flooded at high tide and at low tide mudflats are exposed. These mud flats are habitat for many species of birds and animals. The bay is very shallow. Part of the estuary tidal flats are contained by dikes built in order to make farmland out of the mudflats. The Swinomish Channel is a salt-water channel in Washington State, United States, which connects Skagit Bay, to the south, and Padilla Bay, to the north, separating Fidalgo Island from mainland Skagit County. In the past, the Skagit River had emptied into Padilla Bay.

The Reserve
The reserve contains the Breazeale Interpretive Center, which features exhibits about the natural history and ecology of the estuary and bay, fish tanks, a hands-on room and a video theater.

The site also features classrooms, research facilities, and public access to a beach site. It is a popular location for graduate studies from Western Washington University and the University of Washington.

Padilla Bay is a part of the National Estuarine Research Reserve which it was incorporated into in 1980. It is managed by the Washington Department of Ecology. It has several trails.

The research center is located in the Skagit Valley of Washington.

References

External links

 Padilla Bay National Estuarine Research Reserve - official site
 Breazeale Interpretive Center

Bays of Washington (state)
National Estuarine Research Reserves of the United States
Protected areas of Washington (state)
Natural history museums in Washington (state)
Protected areas of Skagit County, Washington
Museums in Skagit County, Washington
Bodies of water of Skagit County, Washington
Nature centers in Washington (state)
Estuaries of Washington (state)